Byron Black and Jonathan Stark were the defending champions, but lost in second round to Jamie Morgan and Michael Tebbutt.

Yevgeny Kafelnikov and Andrei Olhovskiy won the title by defeating Brian MacPhie and Sandon Stolle 6–2, 6–2 in the final.

Seeds
The first four seeds received a bye into the second round.

Draw

Finals

Top half

Bottom half

References
 Official Results Archive (ATP)
 Official Results Archive (ITF)

Men's Doubles